Maeota is a spider genus of the jumping spider family, Salticidae.

Species
As of June 2017, the World Spider Catalog lists the following species in the genus:
 Maeota betancuri Galvis, 2015 –  Colombia
 Maeota dichrura Simon, 1901 – Brazil
 Maeota dorsalis Zhang & Maddison, 2012 – Brazil
 Maeota flava Zhang & Maddison, 2012 – Brazil
 Maeota glauca Galvis, 2015 – Colombia 
 Maeota ibargueni Galvis, 2014 – Colombia 
 Maeota serrapophysis (Chamberlin & Ivie, 1936) – Panama
 Maeota setastrobilaris Garcilazo-Cruz & Álvarez-Padilla, 2015 – Mexico 
 Maeota tuberculotibiata (Caporiacco, 1955) –  Venezuela

References

Salticidae
Salticidae genera
Spiders of North America
Spiders of South America